Katre may refer to:
Katre (Crete), a town of ancient Crete, Greece
Lakshman Madhav Katre (1926-1985), Indian air force officer, head of the Indian Air Force from 1981 to 1985
Sumitra Mangesh Katre (1906-1998), Indian lexicographer and linguist
Madhukar Katre (1927-2009), Indian politician and trade unionist